"The Way You Are" is a song by the British band Tears for Fears. It was the band's sixth single release overall and their fourth UK Top 40 hit. Released as a single in November 1983, it was intended as a stopgap between the band's first and second albums, mainly to keep the group in the public eye, and was not included on the band's second album.

The song is the only one to be written by the full band, including keyboardist Ian Stanley and drummer Manny Elias. It was written while on tour in support of the band's debut album The Hurting in 1983 and was recorded immediately after the tour's end. Produced by Chris Hughes and Ross Cullum, who produced The Hurting, the song utilised sampled voices and rhythms. Bassist Curt Smith performs lead vocal on the song.

Both it and the instrumental B-side "The Marauders" were later included on the band's 1996 B-sides and rarities collection Saturnine Martial & Lunatic, and on the 2006 Deluxe Edition reissue of Songs from the Big Chair. The extended 12" version of the song was included on the 1999 remastered version of The Hurting.

Band members Roland Orzabal and Curt Smith have been uncompromising in their dislike for the song in the years following its release, Orzabal stating it was "the point we realized we had to change direction", while Smith was even more direct in proclaiming it "the worst thing we've done".

Track listings
7": Mercury / IDEA6 (United Kingdom) / 814 954-7 (Australia, Europe)
 "The Way You Are" (4:53)
 "The Marauders" (4:14)

2x7": Mercury / IDEAS6 (United Kingdom)
 "The Way You Are" (4:53)
 "The Marauders" (4:14)
 "Change [Live in Oxford]" (4:36)
 "Start of the Breakdown [Live in Oxford]" (5:53)

12": Mercury / IDEA612 (United Kingdom) / 814 954-1 (Netherlands) / 818 087-1 (Germany)
 "The Way You Are [Extended Version]" (7:33)
 "The Marauders" (4:14)
 "Start of the Breakdown [Live in Oxford]" (5:53)

12": Mercury / 15PP-42 (Japan)
 "The Way You Are [Extended Version]" (7:33)
 "Pale Shelter [New Extended Version]" (6:41)
 "The Marauders" (4:14)
 "We Are Broken" (4:03)
 "Start of the Breakdown [Live in Oxford]" (5:53)

Chart position

References

1983 singles
1983 songs
Phonogram Records singles
Songs written by Curt Smith
Songs written by Ian Stanley
Songs written by Roland Orzabal
Song recordings produced by Ross Cullum
Song recordings produced by Chris Hughes (record producer)
Tears for Fears songs